Lędyczek  (formerly ) is a village in the administrative district of Gmina Okonek, within Złotów County, Greater Poland Voivodeship, in northwestern Poland.

The village has a population of 526.

Lędyczek was a royal village of the Polish Crown, administratively located in the Człuchów County in the Pomeranian Voivodeship.

References

Villages in Złotów County